Hartshead Pike is a hill in Tameside in Greater Manchester, England, and its name is associated with the monument on its summit. It overlooks Ashton-under-Lyne, Mossley, Saddleworth, Lees and Oldham. On a clear day you can get views of Manchester, Cheshire and Snowdonia in Wales. Hartshead Pike Tower has been a Grade II listed building since 1967.

History

During the Roman occupation of Britain, a warning beacon for local garrisons, possibly lit during times of unrest, may have been sited on Hartshead Pike. Local trackways were routes for the Romans to access the Roman road at Limeside.

The name refers to the hill and the tower.

Tower
The circular, grade-II-listed tower is constructed of hammer-dressed stone with a door on the west side and cusped lancet windows. It has a steeply pitched conical roof above corbelled eaves and dormer roof lights.

The tower was rebuilt in 1863 by John Eaton to commemorate the marriage of Albert Edward to Princess Alexandra, replacing a building that had been there since 1751. An inscription stone reused in the tower states "This Pike Was Rebuilt By Publick Contributions Anno Domini 1751". 

In the 1930s the tower was open to the public and contained a sweet shop; it closed at the outbreak of the Second World War and the tower entrance was bricked up after the war. During 2020 the tower underwent £61,000 of repairs, to stop it from deteriorating.

There is a well on the summit enclosed by a stone slab. The inscription above the tower's entrance reads "Look well at me Before you go And See You nothing at me throw".

Gallery

See also

Listed buildings in Ashton-under-Lyne

References

Mountains and hills of Greater Manchester
Mountains and hills of the Peak District
Grade II listed buildings in the Metropolitan Borough of Tameside